The 1897 Ohio Green and White football team was an American football team that represented Ohio University as an independent during the 1897 college football season. In its fourth season of intercollegiate football, Ohio compiled a 7–2 record and outscored opponents by a total of 150 to 26. Warwick Ford was the team's head coach; it was Ford's first and only season in the position.

Schedule

References

Ohio
Ohio Bobcats football seasons
Ohio Green and White football